Manisilaelaps is a genus of mites in the family Laelapidae.

Species
 Manisilaelaps coronis Lavopierre, 1956

References

Laelapidae